Saint Tikhon's Orthodox Theological Seminary is an Orthodox Christian seminary located in South Canaan Township, Wayne County, Pennsylvania. It is one of three seminaries operated by the Orthodox Church in America, the others being St. Vladimir's Orthodox Theological Seminary in Crestwood, Yonkers, New York, and St. Herman's Orthodox Theological Seminary in Kodiak, Alaska. It is named after Tikhon of Zadonsk.

Overview 
St. Tikhon's was founded in 1938 as a Pastoral School by resolution of the 6th All-American Sobor of the Russian Orthodox Greek Catholic Church in North America (North American Metropolia). The Seminary was officially transformed from a Pastoral School into a Seminary by the Holy Synod of the Metropolia in 1942.

In 1967, the Seminary was chartered by the Commonwealth of Pennsylvania. A formal transfer agreement with Marywood College (now Marywood University), in nearby Scranton, was articulated and signed in 1975. In 1988, the Seminary was authorized by the Pennsylvania Department of Education to award the Master of Divinity (M. Div.) degree to its graduates. The first M. Div. degrees were conferred on the graduating class of 1989.

In June 2004, the Seminary was granted accreditation by the Association of Theological Schools in the United States and Canada.

In March 2010 the Ministry of Education of Greece formally recognized St. Tikhon's Seminary (STS) as an accredited institution of Higher Education, equal in standing to the schools of theology in the universities of Greece. The Greek Ministry of Education (GME) also affirmed that the Master of Divinity degree conferred by STS is equivalent to the first degree in Theology conferred by the Faculties of Theology in the Universities of Athens and Thessalonica, and therefore renders the holder eligible to pursue the graduate studies programs or the doctoral programs (Th.D.) in those universities. Moreover, by virtue of Greece's membership in the European Union (EU), the recognition of STS as an institution of higher theological learning, equal in status with the schools of theology in Greece, also extends to all schools and religious faculties of the universities within the EU's member states.

The current dean of the seminary is Archpriest John Parker, who succeeded the Very Rev. Dr. Steven Voytovich, who succeeded the V. Rev. Alexander Atty, who succeeded Archbishop Michael Dahulich.

Publishing 
St. Tikhon's Monastery Press (formerly the St. Tikhon's Seminary Press) is a leading publisher of Orthodox service books and other spiritual material.

References

External links

St. Tikhon's Bookstore website
 Alexei D. Krindatch. The Study of Educational Institutions Offering Programs in Orthodox Theology in the United States. Assembly of Canonical Orthodox Bishops of the United States of America. October 20, 2015. Retrieved: 18 December, 2015.

Educational institutions established in 1938
Eastern Orthodox seminaries
Seminaries and theological colleges in Pennsylvania
Orthodox Church in America
Eastern Orthodox churches in the United States
Eastern Orthodoxy in Pennsylvania
Rusyn-American culture in Pennsylvania
1938 establishments in Pennsylvania